Farsi1 (Persian: فارسی ۱) was the first international free-to-air Persian language general entertainment channel based in Dubai, United Arab Emirates.

Farsi1 was owned by 21st Century Fox and was operated by Broadcast Middle East, a MOBY Group company.

The channel was managed by Sina Valiollah, who used to be a host and producer years back in Iran.

From 8 June 2013, Farsi1 was renewed with new (mostly American) shows (like Modern Family & White Collar) subtitled in Farsi and from September 2014, Farsi1 was also airing Turkish TV series, like Adini Feriha Koydum, Seyit & Sura and Valley of the Wolves Dubbed in Farsi.

In April 2014, the network announced that they would only be available through Yahsat and would be leaving Hotbird, which led to many angry fans outside of Iran. Farsi1 neglected the fans in Europe with this decision.

The channel closed on 31 December 2016.

Last programming

Dramas

Talk Shows

Game show

Previous programming

References

External links
 Farsi1 Website
 

Television channels and stations established in 2009
Television stations in the United Arab Emirates
Mass media in the United Arab Emirates
Movie channels
Persian-language television stations
Mass media in Iran
Mass media in Dubai